The Mathura - Bhiwani Passenger is a passenger train belonging to North Western Railway zone, which runs between Bhiwani Junction and Mathura Junction. It is currently being operated with 54791/54792 train numbers on a daily basis.

Average speed and frequency 

The 54791/Mathura - Bhiwani Passenger runs with an average speed of 37 km/h and completes 281 km in 7h 30m. The 54792/Bhiwani - Mathura Passenger runs with an average speed of 35 km/h and completes 281 km in 8h 5m.

Route and halts 

The important halts of the train are:

Coach composite 

The train has standard ICF rakes with max speed of 110 kmph. The train consists of 12 coaches:

 10 General Unreserved
 2 Seating cum Luggage Rake

Traction

Both trains are hauled by a Shakur Basti Loco Shed based WDM-2 diesel locomotive from Bhiwani to Mathura and vice versa.

Rake Sharing 

The train shares its rake with 54793/54794 Sawai Madhopur - Mathura Passenger.

Direction Reversal

Train Reverses its direction 1 times:

See also 

 Bhiwani Junction railway station
 Mathura Junction railway station
 Sawai Madhopur - Mathura Passenger

Notes

References

External links 

 54791/Mathura - Bhiwani Passenger
 54792/Bhiwani - Mathura Passenger

Transport in Mathura
Rail transport in Rajasthan
Rail transport in Uttar Pradesh
Rail transport in Haryana
Slow and fast passenger trains in India